The University Belt is the name of a de facto subdistrict in Manila, Philippines. It refers to the area where there is a high concentration of colleges and universities in the city. The districts of Quiapo, Sampaloc, and San Miguel are traditionally considered to be the University Belt, although other clusters of schools that lie along the southern bank of the Pasig River, mostly at the districts of Intramuros and Ermita, as well as the southernmost part of Malate near the city limits are also sometimes included. Each of the colleges and universities found in the district are a short walking distance of each other.

The University Belt is near the Malacañang Palace, thus, protesters would often pass by the colleges and universities on their way to Mendiola Street and the Chino Roces Bridge, a frequent venue of rallies. There are also dorms, restaurants, and cafes around the University Belt.

History 
Since the Spanish colonial period, Manila was the center of education in the country and Intramuros was home to various academic institutions. The first schools in the district were the Colegio de Santa Potenciana founded in 1589, Universidad de San Ignacio in 1590, San Jose Seminary in 1601, the University of Santo Tomas in 1611, the Colegio de San Juan de Letran in 1620, the Santa Isabel College Manila in 1632, Universidad de San Felipe de Austria in 1640, and Ateneo de Manila University in 1859. Today, only Colegio de San Juan de Letran, Santa Isabel College Manila, University of Santo Tomas, and the Ateneo de Manila University continue to operate.

During the American period, the city planner, Daniel Burnham, originally planned to make Santa Mesa the city's education hub, although the Americans wanted institutions to be located near the national government center in Rizal Park, with several institutions opening in Calle Rizal (present-day Taft Avenue), among them the University of the Philippines Manila, the oldest of the constituent universities of the University of the Philippines System, and De La Salle University. Nevertheless, the University Belt within Quiapo, Sampaloc, San Miguel, and Santa Cruz began growing organically. By the early 1900s, nine institutions were present in the area: National University, Manila Law College, University of Manila, San Beda University, Saint Rita College, La Consolacion College Manila, College of the Holy Spirit, and Centro Escolar University, as well as the University of Santo Tomas, which moved from Intramuros to Sampaloc in 1927 although the older campus continued to host the College of Law.

World War II devastated the city and several schools were forced to shut down during the war. In Intramuros, the University of Santo Tomas did not rebuild their campus in the district, while Ateneo de Manila University moved their institution to Sampaloc and eventually to Loyola Heights, Quezon City. Meanwhile, non-sectarian schools were built in the district after the war: Mapúa University moved from its campus in Santa Cruz in 1956, while Lyceum of the Philippines University and Pamantasan ng Lungsod ng Maynila were established in 1952 and 1965 respectively. Outside Intramuros, new institutions were also founded, such as the Eulogio "Amang" Rodriguez Institute of Science and Technology in 1945 and the University of the East in 1946, among others.

List

Within northeastern Manila 

Included are major universities and colleges located in Sampaloc, Quiapo, Santa Cruz, Santa Mesa, and San Miguel.

Taft Avenue 

All institutions are located along or near Taft Avenue, stretching from Ermita to Malate, with a distance of 2.25 miles (3.60 kilometers) from Universidad de Manila in the north to De La Salle University in the south.

Intramuros

All institutions are located within the walled city of Intramuros. It also lies close in the northern tip of the Taft Avenue cluster.

See also

List of universities and colleges in Metro Manila

References

Education in Metro Manila
Academic enclaves
Belt regions